Zelená vlna  is a 1982 Czechoslovak comedy film directed by Václav Vorlíček.

Cast
 Radovan Lukavský - Dr. Pelc
 Rudolf Jelínek - Taxi driver
 Josef Chvalina - Professor Doucha

External links
 

1982 comedy films
1982 films
Czechoslovak comedy films
Films directed by Václav Vorlíček
Czech comedy films
1980s Czech films